Casearia bartlettii is a species of flowering plant in the family Salicaceae found in Mesoamerica (Belize-Guatemala).

References

External links

 

bartlettii
Plants described in 1939
Flora of Belize
Flora of Guatemala